Nicolas Jaeger (20 October 1946 – 27 April 1980) was a French physician and alpinist.

Early life 
Jaeger was born on 20 October 1946 in Boulogne-Billancourt, France, the son of photographer Janine Niépce. He made more than 100 solo ascents in the Mont Blanc massif, including more than a dozen first ascents.

Career 
Jaeger became a mountain guide in 1975. On 15 October 1978, he participated in the first French ascent of Mount Everest. The team leader was Pierre Mazeaud. Other team members included Jean Afanassieff and Kurt Diemberger. From 27 July to 27 September 1979, he spent 60 days alone at  altitude on Huascarán to study the effects of "super-acclimatisation" on himself. He published an account of his experience in Carnets de Solitude the same year.

On 27 April 1980, Jaeger was seen for the last time at  altitude during an attempted ascent of Lhotse Shar in Nepal, and is presumed dead.

First solo ascents 
 1972 – Arête Sans Nom on the Aiguille Verte
 1972 – North spur of Les Droites
 1973 – North–south traverse of the Chamonix Aiguilles
 1975 – Bonatti–Gobbi route on the Grand Pilier d'Angle

See also
List of 20th-century summiters of Mount Everest

References 

1946 births
1980 deaths
Alpine guides
French mountain climbers
High-altitude medicine physicians
Lost explorers
Missing person cases in Nepal
Mountaineering deaths
Sport deaths in Nepal